Kashur may refer to:

Kashur, an other name for the Kashmiri language
Kashur or Kushur, the ancestors of the Mijikenda peoples according to the Book of the Zanj